Stanhopea maculosa is a species of orchid endemic to western Mexico (to Durango).

References

External links 

maculosa
Endemic orchids of Mexico
Flora of Central Mexico
Flora of Durango